The women's 400 metres event  at the 1979 European Athletics Indoor Championships was held on 24 and 25 February in Vienna.

Medalists

Results

Heats
First 2 from each heat (Q) qualified directly for the final.

Final

References

400 metres at the European Athletics Indoor Championships
400
Euro